Suzhou Olympic Sports Centre Station is a station of Line 5, Suzhou Rail Transit. The station is located in Suzhou Industrial Park, Jiangsu and serves the Suzhou Olympic Sports Centre. It has been in use since June 29, 2021; when Line 5 first opened to the public. Upon completion of Line 6, the station will act as one of two interchanges between the lines.

References 

Railway stations in Jiangsu
Suzhou Rail Transit stations
Railway stations in China opened in 2021